The Naples Bible is the second printed Old Testament Bible in Hebrew. The first complete printed Hebrew Bible, by a single publisher, and without commentary, was published by the Soncino brothers in 1488, in Soncino. This was then followed by the Naples Bible in 1491–1493. It is not to be confused with a 14th-century illuminated manuscript Bible, in the Latin Vulgate, also known as the "Illuminated Naples Bible".

External links
 Digital reproduction of the exemplar at the Württembergische Landesbibliothek, Stuttgart
 Entry in the Gesamtkatalog der Wiegendrucke

Notes

Incunabula
1490s books
Early printed Bibles